Nikoloz Shubladze (born 27 December 1993) is a Georgian water polo player for VK Primorac Kotor and the Georgian national team.

He participated at the 2018 Men's European Water Polo Championship.

References

1993 births
Living people
Male water polo players from Georgia (country)
Expatriate water polo players